Hot Rod is a monthly American car magazine devoted to hot rodding, drag racing, and muscle cars—modifying automobiles for performance and appearance.

History
Hot Rod is the oldest magazine devoted to hot rodding, having been published since January 1948. Robert E. Petersen founded the magazine and his Petersen Publishing Company was the original publisher. The first editor of Hot Rod was Wally Parks, who went on to found the National Hot Rod Association (NHRA).  Petersen Publishing was sold to British publisher EMAP in 1998, who then sold the former Petersen magazines to Primedia in 2001. Today it is published by Motor Trend Group, formerly known as TEN: The Enthusiast Network and Source Interlink Media. Source Interlink acquired the magazine along with Primedia's Consumer Magazine division in 2007.

Hot Rod has a strategic relationship with Universal Technical Institute, referring to UTI as its sponsor.

In March 1948, Hot Rod published the first appearance of Tom Medley's cartoon hot rodder, Stroker McGurk. The feature would survive until 1955.

Sponsored events
Between 1961 and 1969, the Hot Rod Magazine Championship Drag Races, "one of the most significant drag racing events" of that era, were hosted by the magazine at Riverside Raceway. The championship offered a US$37,000 prize, greater even than a National Hot Rod Association national event prize at the time.

The "Hot Rod Power Tour" is an organized tour where hot rodders drive a pre-planned route throughout the United States. It began in 1995 when Hot Rod staff members decided to take some of their project cars on a cross-country drive from Los Angeles, California to Norwalk, Ohio. Thousands of people participated along the way but only seven participants (other than staff members) made the entire journey and were inducted into the original "Long Hauler Gang". Since its inception, this event has continued to gain in popularity and is now one of the most anticipated automotive events each year. It is typically six to eight days in length and held in late May or early June. In recent years, the tour has evolved to become what is essentially a continuous trek around the United States in that it begins in or near the location that it ended in the previous year. Each stop is combined with events or activities that vary as much as the participants themselves.

The starting points can change from year to year on the power tour. Tour Stops along the way on the power tour often feature entertainment, celebrities, contests, and games.

Video games
Burnout: Championship Drag Racing (1998) was licensed by Hot Rod. ValuSoft has published Hot Rod: American Street Drag and Hot Rod: Garage to Glory, drag racing video games in which the goal is to win the cover feature of Hot Rod magazine.

References

External links
 Official site

Motor Trend Group
Automobile magazines published in the United States
Magazines established in 1948
Monthly magazines published in the United States
Magazines published in Los Angeles
Automotive events
Turner Sports